In baseball, a triple is the act of a batter safely reaching third base after hitting the ball, with neither the benefit of a fielder's misplay (see error) nor another runner being put out on a fielder's choice. A triple is sometimes called a "three-bagger" or "three-base hit". For statistical and scorekeeping purposes it is denoted by 3B.

Triples have become somewhat rare in Major League Baseball, less common than both the double and the home run. This is because it requires a ball to be hit solidly to a distant part of the field (ordinarily a line drive or fly ball near the foul line closest to right field), or the ball to take an irregular bounce in the outfield, usually against the wall, away from a fielder. It also requires the batter's team to have a good strategic reason for wanting the batter on third base, as a stand-up double is sufficient to put the batter in scoring position and there will often be little strategic advantage to risk being tagged out whilst trying to stretch a double into a triple (although reaching third base with fewer than two outs could potentially allow the runner to reach home plate on a sacrifice fly). On the extreme, the triple may be stretched into the very rare inside-the-park home run. The trend for modern ballparks is to have smaller outfields (generally increasing the number of home runs), ensuring that the career and season triples leaders mostly consist of those who played early in Major League Baseball history, particularly in the dead-ball era.

A walk-off triple (one that ends a game) occurs very infrequently. In general, game-winning hits with a runner on first base are walk-off doubles, since it is quite common for runners starting on first base to score on a double (as it is to make it from first to third on a single). For example, in 2019, there was not a single walk-off triple.

Triples leaders, Major League Baseball

Season

See also
 Single (baseball)
 Double (baseball)
 Home Run
List of Major League Baseball career triples leaders
List of Major League Baseball triples records
List of Major League Baseball single-season triples leaders

References

External links
List of career triples leaders, Baseball-Reference.com
List of single-season triples leaders, Baseball-Reference.com

Baseball terminology
Batting statistics
3 (number)